Made in India was a weekly music programme on Channel V from 1996, specializing in Indipop. The theme song was sang by Alisha Chinai taken from her album of the same name.

References

1996 Indian television series debuts